Dienst is a surname. Notable people with the surname include:

Gottfried Dienst (1919–1998), Swiss football referee
Robert Dienst (1928–2000), Austrian footballer

Occupational surnames
German-language surnames